Gawthorpe is an electoral ward in the non-metropolitan district of Burnley in Lancashire, England. The population of the Burnley Ward at the 2011 census was 6,148. The ward covers the majority of the town of Padiham, meaning it is a largely urban area.  It is part of the Padiham and Burnley West electoral division of Lancashire County Council, the Burnley UK Parliament constituency. Prior to Brexit in 2020 it was part of the North West England European Parliament constituency.

History

The ward is thought to date from the 1974 formation of the borough, however it was extended into the Hapton with Park ward in the 2002 reorganisation.

Elections

The ward elects three councillors, each for a period of 4 years.

Geography

The ward contains approximately the eastern half of the civil parish of Padiham, but not the lands of Gawthorpe Hall for which it is named. The western boundary follows Slade Lane from Huntroyde Hall in the north, staying with the road as it turns into Moor Lane, before crossing Burnley Road and briefly following the River Calder. It then cuts back to the east, along the route of the disused North Lancashire Loop railway to Station road, following as it turns into Thompson Street, then Abingdon Road. Its other boundaries are the same as those of the parish.

The ward contains Shuttleworth College, Padiham Primary School and a Nursery.  Also Padiham Town Hall, Police Station and Fire Station, as well as the retail district and Market.  As previously mentioned the River Calder passes through the ward, as does the A671.  The ward is almost entirely urban in nature, with a single farm in its north-west corner. In 2001, 75.8% of dwellings where in the lowest Council Tax band.

Demography

The United Kingdom Census 2001 showed a total resident population for this ward of 6,119 of which 2,918 are male and 3,201 female, with a mean age of 37.92 Years. The racial composition of the ward is 98% White and 1.23% South Asian or South Asian / British. The largest religious groups are Christian (79.54%) and Muslim (1.05%). 58.8% of adults between the ages of 16 and 74 are classed as economically active and in work.

References

External links
Ward boundaries map at Lancashire MARIO (Note: highly recommend opening this link in a new window or tab)
Office for National Statistics (ONS) - Gawthorpe Ward
Lancashire MADE public - Gawthorpe Ward
Dept. for Children, Schools and Families (DCSF) - Gawthorpe Ward

Wards of Lancashire
Local government in Burnley